Inscriptional Pahlavi is the earliest attested form of Pahlavi scripts, and is evident in clay fragments that have been dated to the reign of Mithridates I (r. 171–138 BC). Other early evidence includes the Pahlavi inscriptions of Arsacid era coins and rock inscriptions of Sassanid kings and other notables such as Kartir.

Letters
Inscriptional Pahlavi used 19 non-joining letters:

Numbers
Inscriptional Pahlavi had its own numerals:

Numbers are written right-to-left.  Numbers without corresponding numerals are additive.  For example, 24 is written as ‎ (20 + 4).

Unicode

Inscriptional Pahlavi script was added to the Unicode Standard in October, 2009 with the release of version 5.2.

The Unicode block for Inscriptional Pahlavi is U+10B60–U+10B7F:

Gallery

References

Abjad writing systems
Iranian inscriptions
Middle Persian
Obsolete writing systems
Persian scripts